Michael Jones (born February 28, 1966) is an American freestyle motocross competitor with over 35 years of professional rider experience. He started his motorcycle racing career in 1972 aged six. Continuing to race up until his last Fastcross in Italy 2000, he became increasingly involved in the emerging sport of Freestyle Motocross, performing half-time jump shows at football games as early as 1987. He is attributed as being "one of the founding fathers of the sport of freestyle motocross" and became known as "Mad" Mike Jones after an Italian promoter described his stunts as "Mad" and "the name stuck". He has appeared in numerous movies, including Crusty Demons and Eight Legged Freaks, and also goes around North American schools to share about his experience.

Early life
Jones was born in Pittsburgh, Pennsylvania on February 28, 1966.

Career highlights
"Mad" Mike is the 1998 World Freestyle Motocross Champion. In 2001, he was the first ever to win the Red Bull X-Fighters competition.

Trick development
Jones is attributed to being co-inventor of the trick "Kiss of Death" along with Ryan Leyba. The trick was developed by the two riders at Manny's yard in Elsinore. He went on to use this trick at Winter X Games Vermont, where Jones achieved a gold medal. He also claims in an interview that he invented the "Coffin", the no-handed landing, and various trick combinations including "Kiss of death Indian" and "Heal Clicker Nothing".

Media appearances
Disturbing the Peace (1997)
Children of a Metal God Trilogy (1998)
Surviving Extreme Sports (2001)
Global Addiction (2002)
Freekstyle (2002)
Crusty Demons 8 (2003)
Freestyle MetalX (2003)
Ski to the Max (2004)
Mad Mikes Mayhem (2005)
Fall Out 2 (2006)
Crusty Demons XII: Dirty Dozen (2006)
MotoXmania (2008)
Mythbusters: Sharkus Maximus (2011)

Music
Jones likes nu- and alternative metal. He has released the compilation album Mad Mike Presents: Mototrax, Vol. 1.

References

1966 births
Living people
Sportspeople from Pennsylvania
American motocross riders
Freestyle motocross riders